Cicek may refer to:

 Ciçek (Eğirdir minnow), species of ray-finned fish in the family Cyprinidae
 Çiçek, Turkish surname